Rostral may refer to:

Anatomy
 Rostral (anatomical term), situated toward the oral or nasal region
 Rostral bone, in ceratopsian dinosaurs
 Rostral organ, of certain fish
 Rostral scale, in snakes and scaled reptiles

Other uses
 Rostral column, a victory column commemorating a naval military victory

See also 

 Rostrum (disambiguation)